is a puzzle arcade game released by Namco in 1993. On March 26, 2009, it was re-released on the Wii Virtual Console.

Gameplay

This game has three modes of play; Adventure, Normal, and Versus. In all three modes, both players must line up blocks of a particular colour - and when three blocks have been lined up (vertically), they will crack. Once a fourth block of that same color lands on the three cracked ones, they will all shatter; for Adventure Mode, the object is to get the trapped sea creatures down to the bottom of the screen. After each ocean has been cleared, the player receives an item which can be activated by pushing the stick up and pressing the button - however, each item can only be used once, and only in the ocean that follows the one it was received at the end of. At the end of the "Mystic Ocean", the player has to defeat a sea demon named Jamir, by cracking the block he is possessing with his face; he will then go on to possess a different block, and once the blocks he possesses have been cracked six times, he will be defeated. However, the game is not over at this point - as there is still one more stage that has to be cleared (called the "Escape Stage"), where the player must get seven pink dolphins and one blue one (which appear as part of the block groups) down to the bottom of the screen.

Reception

In Japan, Game Machine listed Emeraldia in their September 1, 1993 issue as being the eighth most popular table arcade game at the time.

Notes

References

External links
 

1993 video games
Arcade video games
Multiplayer and single-player video games
Namco arcade games
Video games developed in Japan
Virtual Console games
Puzzle video games
Japan-exclusive video games